Puncturella serraticostata is a species of sea snail, a marine gastropod mollusk in the family Fissurellidae, the keyhole limpets and slit limpets.

Distribution
This marine species occurs off KwaZulu-Natal, South Africa.

References

External links
 To World Register of Marine Species
  Herbert D.G. & Kilburn R.N. (1986). Taxonomic studies on the Emarginulinae (Mollusca: Gastropoda: Fissurellidae) of southern Africa and Mozambique. Emarginula, Emarginella, Puncturella, Fissurisepta, and Rimula. South Africa Journal of Zoology. 21(1):1-27

Fissurellidae
Gastropods described in 1986